Throughout the 2000s, Canada Post has issued a large number of stamps with different designs and themes. One of the key changes in the decade was that Canada Post issued series of stamps on a yearly basis. An example is the National Hockey League All-Star Stamps. These stamps began in 2000 to commemorate the 2000 NHL All-Star Game in Toronto. The popularity of the stamps led to the series being produced until 2005. Another example of an ongoing collection is the Chinese Lunar New Year stamps. The stamps have been released on an annual basis with a different animal featured every year. Unlike the United States Postal Service, Canada puts people that are still alive on its stamps. In the 2000s, such people have included Roberta Bondar, Wayne Gretzky, Gerhard Herzberg, and Oscar Peterson.

Besides producing the stamps themselves, Canada Post produces collectibles with the stamp designs in mind. Clocks, collector plates and lithographs feature stamp designs. Flowers were very popular choices for these types of collectibles. The tulip stamps were featured on collector plates (Canada Post item numbers 250437 and 250438) in 2004 and sold for $29.95 each. The Orchids of Canada stamps were used for a 2004 clock (Canada Post item number 314667) and sold at $19.95 each.

Please see Canada Post stamp releases (2005-2009) for any stamps produced between 2005-2009.

Themes

NHL All-Stars Stamp collectibles
The popularity of the NHL All-Stars stamps led to various collectibles. In 2004, the number of collectibles expanded. NHL Heritage Jersey and Stamp Sets were released by Canada Post. The limited edition sets featured a print of vintage team hockey jerseys and the corresponding official NHL All-Stars stamp. Each set was encased in a protective Plexiglas cover and sold for $9.99 each. Another collectible was the 2004 Hockey Puck Bank (Canada Post item number 341659) at $7.99. Each bank featured the images of all six NHL All-Stars that were featured on 2004 Canada Post stamp releases. It measured 16.5 cm (6.5 inches) in diameter and featured a stand.

Dating back to 2002, a Commemorative Stamp and Medallion Set were issued too. It was a collectible honouring the NHL All-Star Game. A souvenir sheet of the six NHL All-Stars featured on stamps for the corresponding year along with six collectible medallions manufactured by the Royal Canadian Mint were part of the set. The set included a premium booklet with career stats for all six NHL All-Stars, a special metal wafer bearing the limited edition number and an official All-Star Game puck. The sets sold for $89.99 each. Approximately 10,000 sets were made in 2002, (item number 243208) and 5,000 were made for 2003 (item number 341616) and 2004 (item number 341634).

Canada Post released other unique types of collectibles too. Special limited edition lithographs were sold at $12.99 each. They measured 279 mm x 356 mm (11 inches x 14 inches). As an added collectible, lithographs were featured in wood-framed canvas prints and were signed by the corresponding player. These were limited to 500 copies each and sold for $89.99 each, along with a certificate of authenticity.

Coasters (item number 341636), made from wood and cork, and presented in a round, black metal container with a logo-embossed lid were sold for $7.99 each. The coasters featured the images of the athletes on the 2004 NHL All-Stars stamps. Another new release for 2004 was All-Star Stamp Cards (item number 341635). These were the same size as standard hockey cards and all six NHL All-Stars were featured in a pack of six cards. There were 17,000 packs produced and as a bonus, one in ten packs featured an autographed card. The cost of one pack was $9.99.

Chinese Lunar New Year
Canada Post debuted its Chinese Lunar New Year stamps with the Year of the Ox in 1997. The popularity of the stamps led to a wide array of products. One of the first collectibles that was created was the Stamp and Precious Coin Set. Although prices vary from year to year, the set would come in a presentation album and feature the Royal Canadian Mint's Chinese Lunar New Year sterling silver coin for the corresponding year. A stamp souvenir sheet was included with a numbered certificate of authenticity. The sets started in 1997 and will continue until 2009.

Besides the stamp and coin set, a framed print is sold too. The framed print started in 2002 with the Year of the Horse. Only 2,500 prints are produced and an officially cancelled Lunar New Year souvenir sheet is affixed and hand numbered. There are also many stamp collectibles as well. The prices vary from year to year due to the continuing increase in the cost of postage stamps and the number of uncut press sheets released.

A Lunar New Year Pack is produced on an annual basis and features a collection of international Chinese Lunar New Year stamps. The stamps come from Canada, China, and Hong Kong. Along with the stamps, the Chinese horoscope for the corresponding year, with the text in three languages, are featured in the pack/folder. (2002-2004 rates - $12.95) Two of the more expensive stamp collectibles are a stamp pane of 25 stamps (2004 rate - $12.25) and an uncut press sheet (2004 rate - $16.95). Lower priced collectibles include a souvenir sheet (2004 rate - $1.40) and the souvenir sheet first day cancel (2004 rate - $2.40). Prepaid domestic and international postcards comprise other low-cost collectibles.

THIS IS A WORK IN PROGRESS
ANYONE WITH STAMP INFORMATION IS WELCOME TO CONTRIBUTE TO THIS PAGE

2000

2001

2002

2003

2004

Commemorative envelopes

Stamp survey
On an annual basis, Canadian Stamp News holds an annual survey. This gives collectors the opportunity to voice their opinions on what are their favourite stamps, and least favourite stamps. The categories include: Favourite Canadian Stamps, Most Relevant Stamps, Least Favourite Stamps, Least Relevant Stamps. The results are as follows:

2003

Favourite Canadian stamps

Most relevant stamps

Least favourite stamps

Least relevant stamps

Choosing Canada's stamps
Although Canada Post is responsible for stamp design and production, the corporation does not actually choose the subjects or the final designs that appear on stamps. That task falls under the jurisprudence of the Stamp Advisory Committee. Their objective is to recommend a balanced stamp program that will have broad-based appeal, regionally and culturally, reflecting Canadian history, heritage, and tradition.

Before Canada Post calls a meeting of the committee, it also welcomes suggestions for stamp subjects from Canadian citizens. Ideas for subjects that have recently appeared on a stamp are declined. The committee works two years in advance and can approve approximately 20 subjects for each year.

Once a stamp subject is selected, Canada Post's Stamp Products group conducts research. Designs are commissioned from two firms, both chosen for their expertise. The designs are presented anonymously to the committee. The committee's process and selection policy have changed little in the thirty years since it was introduced.

Any ideas for a stamp should be sent to: Chairperson of the Stamp Advisory Committee, Canada Post, 2701 Riverside Drive Suite N1070, Ottawa, ON, K1A 0B1.

References

Postage stamps of Canada
Lists of postage stamps